The No. 27 Squadron, nicknamed Zarrars, is a tactical attack squadron from the No. 34 Wing of the Pakistan Air Force's Northern Air Command. It is currently deployed at Rafiqui Airbase and operates the Dassault Mirage-VEF ROSE-III aircraft.

History 

The squadron was formally raised on 19 April 2007 at PAF Base Rafiqui and equipped with the upgraded Dassault Mirage-5EF ROSE-III combat aircraft. The first Officer Commanding (OC) was Wing Commander Shafqat Mushtaq and the first Senior Engineering Officer was Squadron Leader Najam-ul-Hasnain.

Operational History

War On Terror 

After the spillover of militants & terrorists from Afghanistan into the Khyber Pakhtunkhwa province during the US invasion, The Zarrars were tasked to carry out night time air strikes at the former FATA & NWFP regions and participated throughout the insurgency.

See also
List of Pakistan Air Force squadrons
 No. 7 Squadron (Pakistan Air Force)
No. 25 Squadron (Pakistan Air Force)

References

Pakistan Air Force squadrons